The Mauritanian passport is issued to citizens of the Mauritania to travel internationally.

See also
Visa requirements for Mauritanian citizens
List of passports

Foreign relations of Mauritania
Passports by country